Events from the year 1914 in Belgium.

Incumbents
Monarch - Albert I
Prime Minister: Charles de Broqueville

Events
May
 24 May – Belgian general election, 1914

July
 25 July – General mobilisation for the eventuality of war.

August
 4 August – German invasion with attendant atrocities: beginning of Belgian involvement in the First World War.
 5 to 16 August – Battle of Liège.
 12 August – Battle of Haelen (1914)
 20 to 25 August – Siege of Namur (1914)
 21 August – Battle of Charleroi
 23 August – Massacre at Dinant.
 25 August – Burning of Leuven University Library.

September
 28 September – Siege of Antwerp begins

October
 16 to 31 October – Battle of the Yser
 19 October – First Battle of Ypres begins

November
 German occupation of Belgium begins to take shape
 22 November –  First Battle of Ypres ends

Publications
 Hippolyte Fierens-Gevaert, The Brussels Gallery of Old Masters (Brussels, G. van Oest)
 Paul Hamelius, The Siege of Liège: A Personal Narrative (London, T. Werner Laurie)

Births
17 January – Théo Lefèvre, Prime Minister 1961-1965 (died 1973)
23 January – Antonina Grégoire, communist partisan (died 1952)
12 April – Jan van Cauwelaert, bishop (died 2016)
3 June – Karel Kaers, cyclist (died 1972)
17 June
Adriaan Pattin, historian of medieval philosophy (died 2005)
John Van Alphen, footballer (died 1961)

Deaths
January 16 - Alfred de Vinck de Winnezeele, Catholic politician
April 21 - Abel de Kerchove d'Exaerde, politician
July 6 - Albert de Beauffort, politician
August 4 - Antoine-Adolphe Fonck, 1st Belgian soldier killed in World War I
August 19 - Alphonse Six, footballer, 24 (killed in action)
November 17 - Werner de Mérode, Catholic politician (b.1855)
December 9 - Arthur Van Gehuchten, biologist
December 19 - Édouard Brunard, Liberal politician (b.1843)

See also
Western Front (World War I)
World War I

References

 
1910s in Belgium
Years of the 20th century in Belgium
Belgium
Belgium